The FIS Nordic World Ski Championships 1991 took place between 7 and 17 February 1991 in Val di Fiemme, Italy. The women's 5 km was reintroduced after not being held in the previous championships. The men's 10 km was introduced in this championships. Additionally, this was the first championship with a unified German team for the first time officially since 1939 following separate East German and West German teams that had competed from 1958 to 1989.

Men's cross-country

10 km classical 
11 February 1991

15 km freestyle 
9 February 1991

30 km classical 
7 February 1991

50 km freestyle 
17 February 1991

4 × 10 km relay
15 February 1991

Women's cross-country

5 km classical 
12 February 1991

10 km freestyle 
10 February 1991

15 km classical 
8 February 1991

30 km freestyle 
16 February 1991

Yegorova was the last person to win a gold medal for the Soviet Union before its breakup later that year.

4 × 5 km relay
15 February 1991

Men's Nordic combined

15 km individual Gundersen
7 February 1991

3 × 10 km team
13 February 1991

Men's ski jumping

Individual normal hill 
16 February 1991

Individual large hill 
10 February 1991

Petek became the only Yugoslavian to medal before the country's plunge into war later that year. Weissflog was the first German to win an individual medal following reunification of East Germany and West Germany and the first to medal since before World War II.

Team large hill
8 February 1991

Medal table
Medal winners by nation.

References
FIS 1991 cross country results
FIS 1991 Nordic combined results
FIS 1991 ski jumping results

External links

The event at SVT's open archive 

FIS Nordic World Ski Championships
1991 in Italian sport
History of Trentino
Sport in Trentino
1991 in Nordic combined
Cross-country skiing competitions in Italy
February 1991 sports events in Europe
Nordic skiing competitions in Italy